Ophioglossella is a monotypic genus of flowering plants belonging to the family Orchidaceae endemic to New Guinea. The sole species is Ophioglossella chrysostoma.

Description 
This species has been previously misidentified as member of the genera Sarcochilus, Pteroceras, Dryadorchis, and Grosourdya.
Ophioglossella chrysostoma Schuit. & Ormerod is a small, short-stemmed, monopodial epiphyte with nearly sickle-shaped, twisted leaves, and sparsely to many-flowered racemes. The flowers are white with additional pink colouration. The labellum is mobile and does not possess a spur. The androecium consists of four pollinia.

Ecology 

Etymology 
The specific epithet of the type species chrysostoma consists of chryso-, meaning golden, and -stoma meaning mouth. It refers to the golden inner side of the labellum.

Conservation 
This species appears to be widespread, but rare and appears to have a low numbers of individuals.

References

Aeridinae
Vandeae genera
Monotypic Epidendroideae genera
Endemic flora of New Guinea
Plants described in 1998